Ficus wassa is a species of fig in the family Moraceae found in Malesia.

References

wassa